Phoebe Snow (1950–2011) was an American singer.

Phoebe Snow may also refer to:

Phoebe Snow (album), a 1974 album by Phoebe Snow, the American singer
Phoebe Snow (character), a fictional character created by the Delaware, Lackawanna and Western Railroad in 1902 as a marketing symbol for the railroad
Phoebe Snow (train), a named passenger train that ran 1949–1966